"Papa" John DeFrancesco (born September 12, 1940) is an American jazz organist and vocalist, and father of Joey DeFrancesco and Johnny DeFrancesco.

Discography 
 1993: Doodlin'  (Muse)
 1995: Comin' Home (Muse)
 1998: All In The Family (HighNote) with Joey DeFrancesco
 2001: Hip Cake Walk (HighNote)
 2003: Jumpin'  (Savant)
 2004: Walking Uptown (Savant)
 2006: Desert Heat (Savant)
 2009: Big Shot (Savant)
 2011: A Philadelphia Story (Savant)

References

External links
 Biography on 'All About Jazz'
 Review
 Article
Papa John DeFrancesco Interview NAMM Oral History Library (2017)

1940 births
Living people
Soul-jazz organists
Bebop organists
Hard bop organists
Post-bop organists
American people of Italian descent
American jazz organists
American male organists
Musicians from New York (state)
American jazz musicians
Muse Records artists
21st-century organists
21st-century American male musicians
American male jazz musicians
21st-century American keyboardists
HighNote Records artists